Turgut Cansever (12 September 1921 – 22 February 2009) was a Turkish architect and city planner. He is the only architect to win the Aga Khan Award for Architecture three times. He is known as "The Wise Architect". He took charge in many towns, zoning, and protected area projects. He designed Beyazıt Square and was the author of the first art history doctoral thesis in Turkey.

Early life 
Cansever was born in Antalya in 1921 to Hasan and Saime Ferit, as the eldest of five children. His father was an intellectual who chose to study medicine, becoming a leading physician at Sina Front during the war. His mother Saime was a teacher from Plovdiv. His parents fostered an early interest in art, religion and the value of education that would persist in Cansever's work and writing throughout his life. In 1952, he married Mrs. Nilufer. They had three children. All three, son Hasan and daughters Emine and Feyza, chose professional careers as architects.

Cansever attended primary school at Ankara and Bursa. He moved with his family to Istanbul, where he completed his education at Galatasaray High School. There he met and interacted with future intellectuals and artists including Turan Güneş, Turhan Feyzioğlu, İlhan Usmanbaş, Avni Arbaş, and Cihat Burak.

Aspiring to be an artist, he enrolled at Istanbul State Academy of Fine Arts choosing to study Architecture and serving as an assistant to Sedad Hakkı Eldem. After completing his degree in 1946, he began his doctoral thesis under the guidance of Islamic Art History teacher Ernst Diez. In 1949, "Stylistic Analysis of Ottoman and Seljuk Column Heads" was published as the first ever art history doctoral thesis in Turkey, covering 14 Anatolian city and 111 structures. His work was published with the name "Chasing Eternal Space: Column Heads in Ottoman and Seljuk Art".

Career 
Cansever restored Sadullah Paşa's waterfront mansion in 1949.

He established his first architect's office in 1951 with his partner Abdurrahman Hancı. The Anatolian Club Hotel, which they designed together, was one of his important works. Karatepe open-air museum, Diyarbakır College, METU Campus Contest project, and the Turkish Historical Society building were other works designed in the 1950s.

In 1958, Cansever started designing Beyazıt Square. This work moved him to the struggle for town, zoning, and protected areas. He was the head of Marmara Region Planning Organizations from 1959 to 1960. He served on the Istanbul Municipality Planning Authority in 1961.

The 1960s were the time that Cansever met with Bodrum. One of two Aga Khan Award for Architecture he took was brought by Ertegün House was the result of meeting Bodrum.

He traveled through Europe and spent time in France. He assumed the title of associate professor in 1960 with his "Problems of Modern Architecture" thesis at Istanbul University Faculty of Letters.

The Turkish Historical Society building (1951–1967, Ankara, with Ertur Yener) and Ahmet Ertegün House restoration (1971–1973, Bodrum) brought him two Aga Khan awards in 1980. He took his third award in 1992. The Demir Holiday Village Project consists of 3 hotels and 500 houses, carried out by Emine Ogun, Mehmet Ogun, and Feyza Cansever at Mandalya Bay. This project brought him his third Aga Khan Award. He became the only architect to win the Aga Khan Award for Architecture three times.

In 1974–1975 he was the head of the World Bank Istanbul Metropolitan Planning Project. In 1974–1976 he was a Member of the Turkey Delegation of the European Council; in 1975–1980 he worked for the Istanbul Municipality. In 1979 he worked at Ankara Municipality Metropolitan Planning on new habitation and town centers and as protection adviser.

He worked as education program preparation adviser at Makkah University in 1983. That year, he took charge in Master Jury of Aga Khan Award for Architecture.

Cansever continued publication in 1990s. He published many articles and collected his compilations into a book. He published Mimar Sinan's monumental book in 2005.

An exhibition "Turgut Cansever: Architect and thinker" was held in Istanbul, in 2007. It was the first retrospective architecture exhibition prepared with materials that have the characteristics of archival documents.

He was fitted with a pacemaker in 2000, and was bedbound from 2008 on. He died on 22 February 2009 at his house in Kadıköy, Istanbul, and was buried the following day in Edirnekapi cemetery.

Legacy 
He was a thinker about religious and architectural topics. He claimed that God gave the act of judgment to human beings so architects could use this talent to create new designs as human. Contrary to Muslim society, he had concerns about twentieth century mosque architecture. He believed Muslims did not develop mosque architecture, but copied previous designs. His mosque designs added new forms.

References

External links 
 
 
 There was democracy in Islamic architecture (Interview) 

1921 births
2009 deaths
People from Antalya
Turkish architects
Galatasaray High School alumni
Academy of Fine Arts in Istanbul alumni
Istanbul University alumni